The Hesitations are an American R&B group from Cleveland, Ohio. Formed in 1965, they scored several hits in 1967 and 1968, the biggest being their gospel-infused version of the title track to the movie Born Free. After one of the group's singers George "King" Scott was accidentally shot and killed in February 1968, the group disbanded. The Hesitations regrouped in 2006 with new members and are performing and recording once again.

Members
Art Blakey
George Hendricks
Williams Carter
Joyce Blakey
Garey Harbour - Keyboards
Ronnie Wilson Jr. - Drums
Clarence Smith - Bass
Ric Kerr - Guitar
Roger Maple - Saxophone 
Note:This list is incomplete.
George "King" Scott Deceased.
Leonard Veal
Fred Deal

Discography
Albums
Soul Superman (Kapp Records, 1967)
Solid Gold (Kapp, 1968)
The New Born Free (Kapp, 1968) US #193, US Black Albums #30
Where We're At! (Kapp, 1968)

Charting singles
"Soul Superman" (1967) US Black Singles #42
"Born Free" (1968) US #38 / CAN #39
"The Impossible Dream" (1968) US #42
"Climb Every Mountain" (1968) US #90
"A Whiter Shade Of Pale" (1968) US #100 / CAN #83

References

American soul musical groups
Musical groups from Cleveland
Musical groups established in 1965
Musical groups disestablished in 1968
Kapp Records artists